Anolis desiradei, the La Desirade anole, is a species of lizard in the family Dactyloidae. The species is found on La Désirade in Guadeloupe.

References

Anoles
Reptiles described in 1964
Endemic fauna of Guadeloupe
Reptiles of Guadeloupe